The Immanuel High School is a historic school building in rural Arkansas County, Arkansas, USA. It is a single-story wood-frame structure in a U shape, covered in siding, with a cross-gable roof. Built c. 1940, it is the only surviving element of the Immanuel Industrial Institute, a larger complex of buildings built to educate the local African-American population. The complex was merged into a regional school district in 1950, and was closed in 1966. It was used for a variety of other private and non-profit educational purposes afterward, but has been vacant since the mid-1990s.

The building was listed on the National Register of Historic Places in 2007.

See also
National Register of Historic Places listings in Arkansas County, Arkansas

References

School buildings on the National Register of Historic Places in Arkansas
School buildings completed in 1940
National Register of Historic Places in Arkansas County, Arkansas
1940 establishments in Arkansas
Schools in Arkansas County, Arkansas
American Craftsman architecture in Arkansas
Bungalow architecture in Arkansas
Unused buildings in Arkansas
Historically segregated African-American schools in Arkansas